Rail services in Botswana are provided by Botswana Railways in Botswana. Most routes in the country radiate from Gaborone. The railway network consists of 888 km, its gauge is 1,067 mm (3 ft 6 in) cape gauge.

Botswana is an associate member of the International Union of Railways (UIC). Botswana has the 93rd longest railway network in the world,  it is one of the busiest railways in Africa.

History 

The first section of railway track in Botswana was laid in 1896.  Mafeking (now Mafikeng) was then the rail-head and the administrative capital of the British Protectorate of Bechuanaland, now Botswana, even though the town was not within that Protectorate, but was then in the Cape Province of South Africa. The town was the base for the construction of the railway through Botswana to Rhodesia (now Zimbabwe, part of the ambition of Cecil Rhodes for a "Cape to Cairo" railway.  The section through Botswana was built to connect to Bulawayo in Zimbabwe, a route previously covered by horse-drawn stage-coaches.  The first train arrived in Bulawayo on 19th October 1897.

The current owner, Botswana Railways (BR), was created in 1987 when the government of Botswana bought out the Botswana-based sections of the National Railways of Zimbabwe (NRZ).[1] NRZ had been initially operating the rail system after Botswana had gained independence. Management of the BR is supported by RITES Ltd. of India.

The opening of the Beitbridge Bulawayo Railway in Zimbabwe in 1999 resulted in a major drop in the volume of freight transit and income. As a response the BR has been considering the construction of a direct line to Zambia (Zambia Railways), bypassing Zimbabwe, to regain income from transit.

Freight trains 

Over half of BR's freight traffic is in coal, grain and intermodal freight, and the vast majority of its profits are made in South Africa. It also ships automotive parts and assembled automobiles, sulphur, fertilizers, other chemicals, forest products and other types of commodities. Since 1987, coal has become a major commodity hauled by BR. Coal is shipped in unit trains from coal mines to nearby countries.

Passenger trains 

The train was the primary mode of long-distance transport in Botswana until 2009. It also custom-built many of its passenger cars to be able to meet the demands of the lower class. All passenger services were discontinued in 2009, with the only remaining service being an international link to Zimbabwe from Francistown. Freight trains still operate. Passenger service was expected to resume in late 2015.[1] Passenger services were later re-introduced in March 2016. Botswana Railways run two nightly passenger trains, one from Lobatse to Francistown, and the other from Francistown to Lobatse, with stops in Gaborone, Mahalapye, Palapye, and Serule. The passenger train is termed the "BR Express" (Botswana Railways Express).

Sleeping and Dining Department 

Sleeping cars were operated by BR itself. The BR decided from the very beginning that it would operate its own sleeping cars.  Bigger-sized berths and more comfortable surroundings were built. Providing and operating their own cars allowed better control of the service provided as well as keeping all of the revenue received, although profit was never a direct result of providing food to passengers. Rather, it was the realisation that those who could afford to travel great distances expected such facilities and their favourable opinion would bode well to attracting others to Botswana and the BR's trains.

Locomotives

Diesel locomotives 
As of March 2009
 8 General Electric UM 22C diesel-electric locomotives, 1982
 20 General Motors Model GT22LC-2 diesel electric locomotives, 1986
 10 General Electric U15C diesel electric locomotives, 1990

Rail links to adjacent countries 
 Zimbabwe - Same gauge
 South Africa - Same gauge
There is no direct connection with Namibia, but one does exist via South Africa, although an electrified railway connecting to Lüderitz, Namibia for coal traffic is/was scheduled to open in 2006.

In August 2010, Mozambique and Botswana signed a memorandum of understanding to develop an 1100 km railway through Zimbabwe, to carry coal from Serule in Botswana to a deep-water port at Techobanine Point in Mozambique.

A new rail link between Botswana and Zambia, bypassing Zimbabwe was mooted in 2005 by Botswana Railways (BR) general manager Andrew Lunga. The line was envisaged as running south-westwards from Livingstone, crossing the Zambesi, then continuing to a junction with the existing BR tracks at Mosetse. Lunga's proposal arose following the serious loss of traffic suffered by BR following the opening of the Beitbridge-Bulawayo line, after which annual BR freight tonnage fell from 1.1m per annum to about 150,000. Zimbabwe's economic problems had worsened the situation, prejudicing free traffic flow. The suggested line, Lunga pointed out, would provide important alternative routes linking South Africa, Zambia and the Democratic Republic of Congo.

Rail systems in nearby countries 
The following countries mostly use  gauge and are mostly connected together. Countries beyond those listed are of other gauges.
Angola
Republic of the Congo – isolated
Democratic Republic of the Congo – half isolated
Eswatini
Lesotho
Malawi
Mozambique, under repair
Namibia
South Africa
Tanzania same gauge as far as Dar es Salaam – transshipment to  gauge at Kidatu
Zambia
Zimbabwe

See also 

 Transport in Botswana
 Botswana Railways
 Botswana
 Cape gauge

References

External links 

 UN Map of Botswana